Attorney General Peterson may refer to:

Arthur P. Peterson (1858–1895), Attorney General of the Kingdom of Hawaii*Doug Peterson (Nebraska politician) (born 1959), Attorney General of Nebraska
Harry H. Peterson (1890–1985), Attorney General of Minnesota
K. Berry Peterson (1881–1952), Attorney General of Arizona
Leslie Peterson (1923–2015), Attorney General of British Columbia

See also
General Peterson (disambiguation)